Nu Metro Cinemas is a South African cinema company. Its head office is in Dunkeld West, Gauteng.

Nu Metro's history dates to when the first Metro Theatre opened in Johannesburg in 1932. The oldest still-operating Nu Metro cineplex is Bedford, which opened in 1972. The company changed its name from Metro Theatres to Nu Metro Theatres in February, 1988, and then to Nu Metro Cinemas in 2008. Ownership of the company has changed hands multiple times over its 80-plus-year history. Most recently, it was owned by the Times Media Group until 31 December 2013, when it, together with wholly owned subsidiary Popcorn Digital Cinema Advertising, were sold to an independent consortium for R75 million.

Nu Metro Cinemas currently operates 21 cineplexes in South Africa, making it the second-largest cinema operator in the country, after Ster-Kinekor Theatres.

The first film to feature digital audio at Nu Metro was Jurassic Park, in 1993, which played at Bedford Cinema 2 in DTS. Nu Metro's first DCP-compliant digital screen was Montecasino Cinema 11, which went live in December, 2006, with the animated movie Happy Feet. Night at the Museum was its first live action DCP-compliant digital movie. In 2009, Nu Metro Cinemas opened Africa's first all-digital cinema complex at Emperors Palace in Johannesburg. By 2013, 35 mm film had become obsolete on the circuit, with all cineplexes having been converted to DCP-compliant digital screens.

Late in 2014, Nu Metro opened Scene Xtreme cinemas at The Glen and Menlyn Park. The Scene Xtreme offering is similar to the large screen format offered by IMAX. The concept features 4K digital projection, immersive 11.1-channel sound, and reclining seats.

References

External links 

 First African digital cinema multiplex to open
 Official Nu Metro Cinemas website

Cinema chains in South Africa
Culture of Johannesburg
Companies based in Johannesburg